Werner Kogler (born 20 November 1961) is an Austrian politician of the Green Party who has been serving as the Vice-Chancellor of Austria and the minister for Arts, Culture, the Civil Service and Sport in the governments of Chancellors Sebastian Kurz, Alexander Schallenberg, and Karl Nehammer since 7 January 2020.

Kogler has also been serving as the federal spokesman of the Green Party since October 2017. He was a member of the National Council of Austria from 1999-2017 and again from 2019.

Early life and career
Kogler was born in the small east Styrian town of Hartberg. He took his A-Levels in 1980 and subsequently studied economics and law at the University of Graz. In 1994, he graduated with a master's degree in economics.

Political career

Early beginnings
Kogler formed the Alternative List Graz and, in 1982, he was one of the founders of the Alternative List Austria, which merged with the United Greens of Austria to become the current Green Party. In 1985, he was elected to the municipal council of Graz.

Member of the National Council
In 1999, Kogler won election to the National Council. He served the Greens in various positions, including as a member of the federal executive board, and as a representative for the Styrian Greens in 2010. In 2010, Kogler, who was the Greens spokesman on budget issues, delivered a 12-hour, 42-minute speech in opposition to the government's proposed budget, a record breaking filibuster.   He spoke against proposed transatlantic trade agreements and, after the government takeover of Hypo Alpe Adria Bank, traveled the country referring to the affair as Hypo-Krimi, the "Hypo whodunnit".

In 2017, the Greens failed to capture the minimum 4.0% of the vote to be seated in the Austrian parliament. Kogler, having lost his seat, took over as the interim party leader from Ingrid Felipe, which was made permanent in 2018. Following the Ibiza affair, Chancellor Sebastian Kurz, terminated his coalition agreement, which led to a vote of no-confidence and a new election in 2019.

During the 2019 election campaign, Kogler expressed a willingness to go into a coalition with the Austrian People's Party, which was expected to win the election.  The Greens' campaign pushed for an end to government subsidies of fossil fuel and larger investments into environmental initiatives, including public transport and renewable energy.

In 2019, the Greens re-entered the Austrian parliament, achieving their largest vote total in the party’s history with 14% of the vote. From 2019 to 2020, Kogler led coalition negotiations with the Austrian People’s Party and with former chancellor Sebastian Kurz. The parties agreed to a legislative program going forward that included the Greens' desire to make Austria carbon neutral by 2030, an overall increase in the air passenger tax and a €3 day ticket for public transport.  The program included additional restriction on migrants, an extension of the ban on Islamic headscarves in school and lower personal and corporate tax rates. On 7 January 2020, he became the new vice chancellor of Austria.

Other activities
 National Fund of the Republic of Austria for Victims of National Socialism, Member of the Board of Trustees (since 2020)

References

External links
Official Parliament Biography
Official Ministerial Profile

1961 births
Living people
Vice-Chancellors of Austria
The Greens – The Green Alternative politicians
People from Hartberg District
21st-century Austrian politicians
20th-century Austrian politicians